Frog Mill Ait is an island in the River Thames in England between the villages of Medmenham, Buckinghamshire and Hurley, Berkshire. It is situated on the reach above Hurley Lock.

The island is named after a mill on the bank here. Frog Mill Ait and the adjacent Black Boy Island presented a problem to navigation because the towpath was on the other side of the island from the main navigation channel. Hence tow lines had to sweep over the islands, often with the result that barges were pulled onto the shore.

The name "Poisson Deux" is associated with the area, and this is believed to derive from fish ducts or traps in the river here.

See also

Islands in the River Thames

References

Islands of Berkshire
Islands of the River Thames
Hurley, Berkshire